Peter Brayton Nichols (born August 13, 1950) is an American author. He is known for authoring bestsellers, “The Rocks,” (2015, a novel); A Voyage for Madmen, (2001, nonfiction), finalist for the William Hill Sports Book of the Year), Evolution's Captain, (2003, nonfiction) and several other books. His novel Voyage to the North Star was a Book Of The Month Club Main Selection and nominated for the International IMPAC Dublin Literary Award.

He has taught creative writing at Georgetown University, NYU Paris, Bowdoin College, the University of Arizona, and the MFA writing programs at Fairfield University (CT), the University of Arkansas at Monticello, and Antioch University Los Angeles.

Early life and education

Nichols was born in New York City and moved with his family to Britain when he was nine. He attended English boarding schools, where he did poorly at everything except marksmanship with a rifle. He briefly attended East 15 Acting School in London, then worked at a number of jobs, including advertising copy-writing in London, as a reporter on the weekly Monmouthshire Press in Pontypool, Wales, and as a shepherd on a small farm in Radnorshire, Wales.

He holds a BA degree from Skidmore College, and an MFA degree from Antioch University Los Angeles.

Career
In his late twenties and early thirties he lived aboard a small wooden sailboat in the Caribbean and Mediterranean. He became a U.S. Coast Guard licensed yacht captain and navigator, worked as a professional yacht charter and sailboat delivery captain, and has sailed across the Atlantic three times on small yachts, once alone. This part of his life was recounted in his memoir, Sea Change; Alone Across the Atlantic in a Wooden Boat (1997).

He has also worked as a screenwriter, a movie set builder, or 'propmaker,' in Los Angeles, where he became a member of IATSE union, Local 44.

In 2009, Nichols sailed across the Atlantic at the invitation of Dutch public television channel VPRO, with the great-great grandsons of Charles Darwin and Robert FitzRoy, the captain of HMS Beagle, aboard the square-rigged tall ship Stad Amsterdam in a recreation of the Voyage of the Beagle to mark the 150th anniversary of the publication of On the Origin of Species by Charles Darwin.

He is a member of The Explorers Club of New York.

Bibliography

Memoir

Sea Change; Alone Across the Atlantic In A Wooden Boat (1997)

Nonfiction

A Voyage For Madmen (2002)
Evolution's Captain (2004)
Oil & Ice (2010)

Fiction

Voyage To The North Star (1999)
The Rocks (2015)

Anthology
Maybe Baby: 28 Writers Tell the Truth About Skepticism, Infertility, Baby Lust, Childlessness, Ambivalence, and How They Made the Biggest Decision of Their LivesHardcover – March 28, 2006
Reimagining Place ECOTONE The Evolution Issue Paperback – January 1, 2008

References

American male writers
Living people
1950 births